The Shirshov Institute of Oceanology (P.P. Shirshov Institute of Oceanology (IO) RAN) is the premier research institution for ocean, climate, and earth science in Russia. It was established in 1946 and is part of the Russian Academy of Sciences. It is headquartered in Moscow.

The institute is named after Pyotr Shirshov, who founded it in 1946. Amongst others, Andrei Monin served as director.

Notable past or present researchers

Biologists
Igor Akimushkin (d. 1993)

Climate scientists
Olga Zolina

Mathematicians
Grigory Barenblatt (d. 2018)
Andrei Monin, Director of the Institute 1965-1987 (d. 2007)

Physical oceanographers
Leonid Brekhovskikh (d. 2005)
Vladimir Shtokman (d. 1968)

Others
Anatoly Sagalevich, explorer and pilot of the MIR submersible to the seabed under the North Pole (the Arktika 2007 project)
Alexander Gorodnitsky, poet and geologist

Fleet 

 RV Akademik Ioffe (:ru:Академик Иоффе (судно))
 RV Akademik Sergey Vavilov
 RV Akademik Mstislav Keldysh
 RV Professor Shtokman (:ru:Профессор Штокман (судно))
 RV Rift
 RV Akvanaft
 MIR (submersible)
  - not active since 1979; now a museum in Kaliningrad.

See also
 Nikolai M. Knipovich Polar Research Institute of Marine Fisheries and Oceanography
 List of Russian oceanographers

References

External links
 Official website

Institutes of the Russian Academy of Sciences
Universities and institutes established in the Soviet Union
Research institutes in the Soviet Union
Educational institutions established in 1946
Earth science research institutes
1946 establishments in the Soviet Union
Oceanographic organizations